Tenkayedapadavu  is a panchayat village in the southern state of Karnataka, India. Administratively, it is under Mangalore taluk of Dakshina Kannada district in Karnataka. It is located at a distance of 26 km from Mangalore city. There are two villages in the gram panchayat, Tenkayedapadavu and Badagayedapadavu.
The village Tenka Yedapadav is the part of Yedapadavu, divided for easier administration of village. The Post name is "Shibrikere" which means "Shabari lake". In Yedapadav there are 2 temples, the Shri Rama Mandira and the Shri Adishakthi Durga Parameshwari Temple.
There are also 2 primary and secondary level schools, and one Pre-University college named "Swami Vivekananda Pre-University college, Yedapadavu". Shri Krishna Janmastami & Ramanavami are two festivals that are held in the village, with the people taking to celebrate "Masaru Kuduke ustava" in a grand manner.
Yedapadav is the middle village for Ganjimatt and Moodbidiri and also Kuppe Padavu.

Demographics
 India census, Tenkayedapadavu had a population of 6,073 with 3,069 males and 3,004 females.

 census, Tenkayedapadavu reported 6,246 inhabitants.

Subvillages
Among the subvillages in Tenkayedapadavu are:

See also
 Mangalore taluk
 Dakshina Kannada

References

External links
 http://dk.nic.in/

Villages in Dakshina Kannada district
Localities in Mangalore